Bill Halverson (born 1942) is an American record producer and engineer who worked on several critically acclaimed rock records of the 1960s and 1970s. He is most well known for working with Crosby, Stills, Nash & Young and their respective solo albums. His other engineering credits include Jimi Hendrix, Joe Cocker, Chuck Berry, Eric Clapton, and Emmylou Harris.

Career
Halverson, a bass trombone player in the Dominguez Hills Junior College all-star jazz band, met engineer Wally Heider during a 1960 recording session at United Recording, and the two formed a friendship. Over the next four years, Halverson toured with music acts like Tex Beneke. After Halverson left Beneke's band in 1964, Heider hired him as assistant engineer at the newly-opened Studio 3 in Hollywood. Later, Halverson assisted Heider in recording the 1967 Monterey Pop Festival, and eventually managed Studio 3 while Heider built Wally Heider Studios in San Francisco.

In early 1969, Halverson engineered Crosby, Stills, & Nash's self-titled debut studio album. Halverson became a freelance engineer in 1970, and relocated to Nashville in 1985. Halverson's engineering credits include Cream and Eric Clapton, CSNY members Stephen Stills and Graham Nash, Jimi Hendrix, Joe Cocker, Chuck Berry, and Emmylou Harris.

Discography

Albums engineered 
 The Beach Boys - Wild Honey
 Cream - Wheels Of Fire
 Pacific Gas and Electric - Get It On
 Zephyr - Tommy Bolin/Zephyr
 Cream - Goodbye
 Crosby, Stills, & Nash - Crosby Stills, & Nash
 Stephen Stills - Stephen Stills
 Delaney & Bonnie - On Tour With Eric Clapton
 Cream - Live Cream
 Crosby, Stills, Nash & Young - Deja Vu
 Eric Clapton - Eric Clapton
 Stephen Stills - Stephen Stills 2
 Graham Nash - Songs For Beginners
 Bill Withers - Just As I Am
 Judee Sill - Judee SIll
 Crosby, Stills, Nash & Young - 4 Way Street
 Cream - Live Cream Vol. 2
 America - Homecoming
 Crosby & Nash - Graham Nash/ David Crosby
 Stephen Stills/Manassas - Down The Road
 Crosby, Stills, Nash & Young - So Far
 REO Speedwagon - Lost In A Dream
 Stephen Stills - Stills
 Stephen Stills - Stephen Stills Live
 Beach Boys - Spirit Of America
 Bobby Whitlock - One Of A Kind
 Kraftwerk - Trans-Europe Express
 Jack Bruce - How's Tricks

References 

1942 births
American record producers
Living people